The 1986 German motorcycle Grand Prix was the third round of the 1986 Grand Prix motorcycle racing season. It took place on the weekend of 23–25 May 1986 at the Nürburgring.

Classification

500 cc

References

German motorcycle Grand Prix
German
German Motorcycle
Sport in Rhineland-Palatinate